Iain S. Duff is a British mathematician and computer scientist, known for his work in numerical methods and software for solving problem with  sparse matrices, in particular the Harwell Subroutine Library. From 1986 to 2009, he was the Group Leader of Numerical Analysis at Harwell Laboratory, which has moved in 1990 to the Rutherford Appleton Laboratory. He is also the Project Leader for the Parallel Algorithms Group  at CERFACS in Toulouse.

See also
MUMPS
Multifrontal method

External links

Iain S. Duff home page
HSL, formerly the Harwell Subroutine Library
Harwell-Boeing sparse matrix collection at Matrix Market
Oral History interview with Duff by Thomas Haigh. Full text online as part of SIAM history project, covers his entire career.

1947 births
Living people
Scientists from Glasgow
Alumni of the University of Oxford
20th-century British mathematicians
21st-century British mathematicians
British computer scientists
Numerical analysts
Fellows of the Society for Industrial and Applied Mathematics